Pop is a British fashion magazine co-founded in 2000 by Ashley Heath and editor Katie Grand. The initial creative directors for the magazine were Lee Swillingham and Stuart Spalding. Pop is published bi-annually.

History
In 1999, the publishing house Emap enticed Grand to leave Dazed & Confused and invited her to work on the cult magazine The Face, as the magazine's official fashion director. At the same time Emap offered her a position as Editor-in-Chief of an as-yet unnamed new magazine. The first issue of Pop was launched in September 2000. Grand said that her main concept was that "it to be really jolly. And pink — I was obsessed with it being pink."

Grand left Pop in 2008, along with creative directors Swillingham and Spalding, to establish a rival magazine, Love, published by Conde Nast.

Pop relaunched in an online digital format as THEPOP.COM. and the first issue under new management was released on 1 September 2009. Dasha Zhukova was hired as editor-in-chief with Ashley Heath as the Editorial Director and David Girhammar as an editor.

On 1 September 2010 Britney Spears appeared on the cover of the magazine for her first time.

New Digital Era
As of 2022, their website read "A new era of POP magazine. Change is good, change is inevitable, change is now".  As an iconic, leading pop culture influencer, POP magazine shifted its ways of curating and directing fashion.  They have what they coin 'Pop Films', which are film shorts that are intended to advertise product and lifestyle in an aesthetically pleasing way.  They have a great presence and reach on social media.

References

External links

Bauer Group (UK)
Pop
Biannual magazines published in the United Kingdom
2000 establishments in the United Kingdom
Magazines established in 2000
Magazines published in London